Navasota persectella is a species of snout moth in the genus Navasota. It was described by George Hampson in 1918 and is known from Timor (including Dili, the type location).

References

Moths described in 1918
Anerastiini
Insects of Timor